Anton Georg Zwengauer (12 June 1850, in München – 18 January 1928) was a German painter.  He was the son of painter Anton Zwengauer, and studied with Arthur von Ramberg from 1871 until 1874.  Ludwig II of Bavaria was his patron beginning in 1869.

References
Anton Georg Zwengauer on artnet
A collection of his works for sale

1850 births
1928 deaths
19th-century German painters
German male painters
20th-century German painters
20th-century German male artists
Artists from Munich
19th-century German male artists